Derek Walcott Square (formerly Columbus Square) is a public square and park located in central Castries, Saint Lucia.

The square is bounded by Bourbon, Brazil, Laborie and Micoud Streets.

The Cathedral of the Immaculate Conception and the Castries Central Library are located at the square.

The square was previously named Place d'Armes and Promenade Square. It was named Columbus Square in 1892.
In 1993, it was named Derek Walcott Square after the Nobel laureate Derek Walcott.

References

Castries
Parks in Saint Lucia
Squares in the Caribbean